SEX is the second studio album by the Russian pop group Vintage, released in 2009. In addition to the regular edition of the album, which was released on October 14, 2009, there is also a collector's edition with an additional DVD.

History
The album is a conceptual work, the main theme of which is sex. The disc received mostly positive reviews from critics, who noted the high quality of the recording and the well-realized concept of the album.

The disc was a moderate commercial success, debuting at No. 12 on the Russian Album Chart. In support of the album, a promotional campaign was organized, which included a presentation of the album in Moscow and a promo tour to the cities of the CIS. According to the band members, the album SEX is a musical and sexual encyclopedia where all possible types of love have found their place: venal, fleeting, homosexual.

The album was also nominated in the category Album of the Year  at the 2010 Muz-TV Awards.

Track listing
 SEX – 5:07
 Victoria – 3:56
On/Off – 2:54  
Make Me Hurt – 4:13
Sleepwalking Girls – 4:11  
Boy – 3:48
Eva – 4:11  
Bad Girl  (with Elena Korikova) – 3:35 
Loneliness of Love – 3:57
You Are for Me – 3:37
Striptease – 3:53 
Sex Dance – 2:58
XXL – 3:57

Personnel

 Anna Pletnyova — sound production, vocals
 Alexey Romanov — music (tracks 1-3, 6-13), lyrics (tracks 4-6, 13), sound production, backing vocals
 Alexander Sakharov — music (tracks 4, 5), lyrics (tracks 1-3, 5-10, 12), arrangement, mixing, mastering, sound production
Yuri Usachyov — music (track 7)
Alexander Kovalyov — lyrics  (tracks 6, 11)
Ksenia Sakharova — lyrics  (track 13)
Eva Polna — lyrics  (track 7)
Elena Korikova — vocals (track 8)
 Yevgeny Kuritsyn — photo

References

External links

 Аня Плетнёва: «Мы разрешаем то, что в России запретили»

2009 albums
Vintage (band) albums
Concept albums
LGBT-related albums
Russian-language albums